Glees is a municipality in the district of Ahrweiler, in Rhineland-Palatinate, Germany. It lies near the Maria Laach Abbey.

References

Populated places in Ahrweiler (district)